Pterostylis barringtonensis,  commonly known as the Barrington leafy greenhood,  is a plant in the orchid family Orchidaceae and is endemic to New South Wales. As with similar greenhoods, the flowering plants differ from those which are not flowering. The non-flowering plants have a rosette  of leaves on a short stalk but the flowering plants lack a rosette and have up to seven dark green flowers on a flowering stem with stem leaves. It is only known from Barrington Tops.

Description
Pterostylis barringtonensis, is a terrestrial,  perennial, deciduous, herb with an underground tuber. The dorsal sepal and petals are joined to form a hood called the "galea" over the column. The galea is dark green with darker green lines and a brown, tapered tip. Flowering occurs from June to August.

Taxonomy and naming
The Barrington greenhood was first formally described in 2006 by David Jones who gave it the name Bunochilus barringtonensis. The description was published in Australian Orchid Research from a specimen collected in the Barrington Tops National Park. In 2010, Gary Backhouse changed the name to Pterostylis barringtonensis. The specific epithet (barringtonensis) refers to the area where this greenhood grows with the Latin suffix -ensis meaning "place for" or "where", referring to Barrington Tops.

Distribution and habitat
Pterostylis barringtonensis occurs in moist places in tall forest in the Barrington Tops area.

References

barringtonensis
Endemic orchids of Australia
Orchids of New South Wales
Plants described in 2006